Vivian Balakrishnan (born 1961) is a Singaporean politician, diplomat and former ophthalmologist who has been serving as Minister for Foreign Affairs since 2015. A member of the governing People's Action Party (PAP), he has been the Member of Parliament (MP) for the Cashew division of Holland–Bukit Timah GRC since 2006, and previously the Ulu Pandan division of Holland–Bukit Panjang GRC between 2001 and 2006. 

He previously served as Second Minister for Trade and Industry between 2005 and 2006, Minister for Community, Youth and Sports between 2005 and 2011, Second Minister for Information, Communications and the Arts between 2006 and 2008, Minister for the Environment and Water Resources between 2011 and 2015, and Minister-in-charge of the Smart Nation Initiative between 2014 and 2017.

A President's Scholar, Balakrishnan studied medicine at the Yong Loo Lin School of Medicine at the National University of Singapore and underwent postgraduate specialist training in ophthalmology before he was admitted as a fellow of the Royal College of Surgeons of Edinburgh. From 1999 to 2002, he served as the commanding officer of the Second Combat Support Hospital of the Singapore Armed Forces (SAF), while holding the positions of medical director of the Singapore National Eye Centre and chief executive officer of the Singapore General Hospital concurrently.

Balakrishnan made his political debut in the 2001 general election as part of a five-member PAP team contesting in Holland–Bukit Panjang GRC and won by an uncontested walkover. He was subsequently appointed as Minister of State for National Development in 2002, and Senior Minister of State for Trade and Industry in 2004.

Early life and education
Vivian Balakrishnan was born on 25 January 1961 in Singapore to an Indian Tamil father and a Chinese mother with ancestry from Fuqing, Fujian. 

He was educated at Anglo-Chinese School and National Junior College before he was conferred the President's Scholarship in 1980 to study medicine at the Yong Loo Lin School of Medicine at the National University of Singapore. He served two terms as the president of the NUS Student Union, and later the chairman of the union council. 

Balakrishnan chose a postgraduate specialisation in ophthalmology and became a fellow of the Royal College of Surgeons of Edinburgh in 1991.

Medical career
Balakrishnan had worked at Moorfields Eye Hospital in London between 1993 and 1995 as a specialist senior registrar, where he subspecialised in paediatric ophthalmology. 

When Balakrishnan returned to Singapore, he became a consultant ophthalmologist at the Singapore National Eye Centre and National University Hospital, and an associate professor of ophthalmology at the National University of Singapore in 1998. 

In 1999, he became the medical director of the Singapore National Eye Centre, and later the chief executive officer of the Singapore General Hospital in 2000. Balakrishnan was also the commanding officer of the 2nd Combat Support Hospital of the Singapore Armed Forces (SAF) between 1999 and 2002.

In the 1990s, he hosted the series Health Matters on Singapore television.

Political career

Balakrishnan made his political debut in the 2001 general election as part of the five-member PAP team contesting in Holland–Bukit Panjang GRC and won by an uncontested walkover. He was subsequently appointed Minister of State for National Development, and Chairman of the Remaking Singapore Committee in 2002. He was later appointed Senior Minister of State for Trade and Industry in 2004.

In 2004, Balakrishnan was appointed acting Minister for Community Development, Youth and Sports. He was made a full member of the Cabinet in 2005.

During the 2006 general election, Balakrishnan was part of a five-member PAP team led by Lim Swee Say, contesting in Holland–Bukit Timah GRC and won by an uncontested walkover. 

During a Committee of Supply debate in Parliament on 9 March 2007 regarding the estimates of expenditure for the Ministry of Community Development, Youth and Sports (MCYS), an MP for Jalan Besar GRC, Lily Neo asked Balakrishnan whether the ministry would consider raising the Public Assistance rates for the purpose of ensuring recipients are able to have three meals a day, to which Balakrishnan replied with "How much do you want?  Do you want three meals in a hawker centre, food court or restaurant?"

As Minister for Community Development, Youth and Sports, Balakrishnan raised the public assistance scheme from $260 for a single-person household in 2007, to $400 for a single-person household in 2011.

During the 2011 general election, Balakrishnan led the four-member PAP team which includes Liang Eng Hwa, Christopher de Souza and Sim Ann contesting in Holland–Bukit Timah GRC and won 60.1% of the vote. This was the first time Holland–Bukit Timah GRC were being contested since its formation in 2001.

During the political campaign for the 2011 general election, Balakrishnan said that the candidates from the Singapore Democratic Party (SDP) did not have any plans for the constituency, and their selection of Holland–Bukit Timah GRC was an opportunistic act. He suggested that they were trying to suppress a certain YouTube video featuring a member of their team and that it raised questions about their agenda and motivation. It was later discovered that the video included Vincent Wijeysingha at a forum discussing issues surrounding gay rights and section 377A of the Penal Code in Singapore. The PAP team issued a statement asking the SDP team whether they were pursuing a "gay agenda". The SDP denied it, saying that they were not pursuing the gay agenda and the issue was put to rest. The PAP drew criticism from internet users in Singapore for their election strategy.

At the same election, the SDP candidates raised the issue of government spending for the 2010 Summer Youth Olympics, which Balakrishnan had overseen as Minister for Community Development, Youth and Sports, saying that the budget exceeded the initial estimates of S$104 million by over three times. Balakrishnan acknowledged that they had got the initial estimates wrong as it was the first time that an event of that scale was organised in Singapore. He asserted that the increased budget did not affect other programmes of the ministry, and that 70% of the spending for the event went into paying local firms for their services. He declared that his team had spent less than the finalised budget amount and did not waste money.

On 21 May 2011, Balakrishnan was appointed Minister for the Environment and Water Resources, taking over from Yaacob Ibrahim. After the 2015 general election, Balakrishnan was appointed Minister for Foreign Affairs.

In response to a parliamentary question on 5 January 2021 regarding the use of data from the contact tracing app developed during the COVID-19 pandemic known as TraceTogether, the Minister of State for Home Affairs Desmond Tan replied that under the Criminal Procedure Code, the Police can access TraceTogether data for the purpose of criminal investigations, despite Balakrishnan's assurance to the public 8 months earlier in June 2020 that TraceTogether data will only be used for contact tracing purposes. Balakrishnan later said in Parliament "I take full responsibility for this mistake. And I deeply regret the consternation and anxiety caused".

In September 2021, during a debate in Parliament about the Comprehensive Economic Cooperation Agreement, a hot mic picked up Balakrishnan referring to NCMP Leong Mun Wai of the Progress Singapore Party as "illiterate" and questioning how Leong got into Raffles Institution (RI) in a conversation with fellow PAP MPs on the front bench. Balakrishnan subsequently called Leong to apologise.

Personal life
He is married to Joy Balakrishnan, and they have a daughter and three sons. He is a Christian.

References

External links

 Vivian Balakrishnan on Prime Minister's Office
 Vivian Balakrishnan on Parliament of Singapore
Vivian Balakrishnan's Blog

Members of the Cabinet of Singapore
Members of the Parliament of Singapore
People's Action Party politicians
Singaporean ophthalmologists
Fellows of the Royal College of Surgeons
President's Scholars
Anglo-Chinese School alumni
National Junior College alumni
National University of Singapore alumni
Singaporean people of Tamil descent
Singaporean Tamil politicians
Singaporean Christians
1961 births
Living people
Recipients of the Olympic Order
Environment ministers of Singapore
Singaporean politicians of Indian descent
Ministers for Foreign Affairs of Singapore
Singaporean people of Chinese descent